Trichopeltariidae is a family of crabs in the crustacean order Decapoda.

Genera

The family contains five genera:

Peltarion 
Podocatactes 
Pteropeltarion 
Sphaeropeltarion 
Trichopeltarion

References

Decapod families
Decapods